Richard Rathbone Graham Hobson (July 28, 1931 – May 23, 2021) was an American attorney and politician who served two terms in the Virginia House of Delegates before opting to forgo reelection in 1979.

References

External links

1931 births
2021 deaths
Democratic Party members of the Virginia House of Delegates
Politicians from Alexandria, Virginia
People from Orange, New Jersey
Virginia lawyers
Princeton University alumni
Harvard Law School alumni